Yauheni Lazuka or Yevgeniy Lazuka (born 13 April 1989 in Salihorsk, Belarus) is an Azerbaijani swimmer of Belarusian origin. At the 2008 Summer Olympics, he competed in the 100 m butterfly and the 4 x 100 m medley relay.  At the 2012 Summer Olympics, he competed in the Men's 100 metre butterfly, finishing in 38th place overall in the heats, failing to qualify for the semifinals.

References

Azerbaijani male swimmers
Belarusian male swimmers
Living people
Olympic swimmers of Azerbaijan
Olympic swimmers of Belarus
Swimmers at the 2008 Summer Olympics
Swimmers at the 2012 Summer Olympics
Male butterfly swimmers
Place of birth missing (living people)
1989 births
People from Salihorsk
Sportspeople from Minsk Region